Glamour Boy is a 1941 American comedy film directed by Ralph Murphy and written by Val Burton, F. Hugh Herbert and Bradford Ropes. The film stars Jackie Cooper, Susanna Foster, Walter Abel, Darryl Hickman, Ann Gillis, William Demarest and Jackie Searl. The film was released on December 5, 1941, by Paramount Pictures.

Plot

Former child star Tiny Barlow is all grown up now but desperate to regain his old fame. He grabs credit for landing aspiring actress Joan Winslow a part that was intended for bigger star Brenda Lee, then tries to persuade studio head A. J. Colder to remake the film that made him a star.

Tiny's schemes land him a part in a new film, but he quits when others mock him on the set. A new child star, Billy Doran, hides in the trunk of Tiny's car, and they end up taking shelter on a farm hundreds of miles from Hollywood, where young Billy decides to pretend he's been kidnapped. Joan's pleas convince Tiny and Billy to return.

Cast 
Jackie Cooper as Tiny Barlow
Susanna Foster as Joan Winslow
Walter Abel as Anthony J. Colder
Darryl Hickman as Billy Doran
Ann Gillis as Brenda Lee
William Demarest as Papa Doran
Jackie Searl as Georgie Clemons
Edith Meiser as Jenny Sullivan 
John Gallaudet as Mickey Fadden
William Wright as Hank Landon
Charles D. Brown as Martin Carmichael
Norma Varden as Mrs. Lee
Kay Linaker as Mrs. Emily Colder
Maude Eburne as Borax Betty
Josephine Whittell as Helga Harris
Olive Blakeney as Miss Treat
Karin Booth as Helen Trent 
Trevor Bardette as Sheriff
Cecil B. DeMille as Movie Director (uncredited)

References

External links 
 

1941 films
Paramount Pictures films
American comedy films
1941 comedy films
Films directed by Ralph Murphy
Films produced by Sol C. Siegel
American black-and-white films
1940s English-language films
1940s American films